Guyana ( or ), officially the Cooperative Republic of Guyana, is a country on the northern mainland of South America. Guyana is an indigenous word which means "Land of Many Waters". The capital city is Georgetown. Guyana is bordered by the Atlantic Ocean to the north, Brazil to the south and southwest, Venezuela to the west, and Suriname to the east. With , Guyana is the third-smallest sovereign state by area in mainland South America after Uruguay and Suriname, and is the second-least populous sovereign state in South America after Suriname; it is also one of the least densely populated countries on Earth. It has a wide variety of natural habitats and a very high biodiversity.

The region known as "the Guianas" consists of the large shield landmass north of the Amazon River and east of the Orinoco River known as the "land of many waters". Nine indigenous tribes reside in Guyana: the Wai Wai, Macushi, Patamona, Lokono, Kalina, Wapishana, Pemon, Akawaio and Warao. Historically dominated by the Lokono and Kalina tribes, Guyana was colonised by the Dutch before coming under British control in the late 18th century. It was governed as British Guiana, with a mostly plantation-style economy until the 1950s. It gained independence in 1966, and officially became a republic within the Commonwealth of Nations in 1970. The legacy of British rule is reflected in the country's political administration and diverse population, which includes Indian, African, Indigenous, Chinese, Portuguese, other European, and various multiracial groups. In 2017, 41% of the population of Guyana lived below the poverty line.

Guyana is the only South American nation in which English is the official language. However, the majority of the population speak Guyanese Creole, an English-based creole language, as a first language. Guyana is part of the Anglophone Caribbean. It is part of the mainland Caribbean region maintaining strong cultural, historical, and political ties with other Caribbean countries as well as serving as the headquarters for the Caribbean Community (CARICOM). In 2008, the country joined the Union of South American Nations as a founding member.

Guyana's economy has been undergoing a transformation since the discovery of crude oil in 2015 and commercial drilling in 2019, being one of the only economies to grow despite the pandemic in 2020 at 49% GDP growth through the year. Due to Guyana's small population and as much as 11 billion barrels in oil reserves, the country is on course to become one of the largest per capita oil producers in the world by 2030. The discovery of over 11 billion barrels of oil reserves off the coast of Guyana in the last five years is the largest addition to global oil reserves in the last 50 years.

Etymology
The name "Guyana" derives from Guiana, the original name for the region that included Guyana (British Guiana), Suriname (Dutch Guiana), French Guiana, and the Guayana Region in Venezuela (Spanish Guyana) and Amapá in Brazil (Portuguese Guiana). According to the Oxford English Dictionary, "Guyana" comes from an indigenous Amerindian language and means "land of many waters". The Co‑operative Republic of Guyana in the official name referred to co-operative socialism.

History

Before colonization
Nine indigenous tribes reside in Guyana: the Wai Wai; Macushi; Patamona; Lokono; Kalina; Wapishana; Pemon; Akawaio; and Warao.

Historically, the Lokono and Kalina tribes dominated Guyana.

Colonial period
Although Christopher Columbus was the first European to sight Guyana during his third voyage (in 1498), and Sir Walter Raleigh wrote an account in 1596, the Dutch were the first Europeans to establish colonies: Pomeroon (1581), Essequibo (1616), Berbice (1627), and Demerara (1752). After the British assumed control in 1796, the Dutch formally ceded the area in 1814.

In 1831, the united colonies of Demerara-Essequibo and separate colony of Berbice together became a single British colony known as British Guiana.

Since its independence in 1824, Venezuela has claimed the area of land to the west of the Essequibo River. Simón Bolívar wrote to the British government warning against the Berbice and Demerara settlers settling on land which the Venezuelans, as assumed heirs of Spanish claims on the area dating to the 16th century, claimed was theirs. In 1899, an international tribunal ruled that the land belonged to Great Britain. The British territorial claim stemmed from Dutch involvement and colonization of the area also dating to the 16th century, which was ceded to the British.

Independence
Guyana achieved independence from the United Kingdom as a dominion on 26 May 1966 and became a republic on 23 February 1970, remaining a member of the Commonwealth. Shortly after independence, Venezuela began to take diplomatic, economic and military action against Guyana in order to enforce its territorial claim to the Guayana Esequiba. The US State Department and the US Central Intelligence Agency (CIA), along with the British government, also played a strong role in influencing political control in Guyana during this time. The American government supported Forbes Burnham during the early years of independence because Cheddi Jagan was identified as a Marxist. They provided secret financial support and political campaign advice to Burnham's People's National Congress, to the detriment of the Jagan-led People's Progressive Party, which was mostly supported by Guyanese of Indian background.

Guyana was elected twice as member of the UN Security Council in 1975–76 and later 1982–83.

In 1978, a total of 918 people died at the Jonestown mass murder-suicide led by cult leader Jim Jones.

In May 2008, President Bharrat Jagdeo was a signatory to the UNASUR Constitutive Treaty of the Union of South American Nations. The Guyanese government officially ratified the treaty in 2010.

In March 2020, President David A. Granger narrowly lost the snap elections, following Granger's government loss of a vote of no confidence back in 2018. Granger refused to accept the results, but eventually five months later, Irfaan Ali of the People's Progressive Party/Civic was sworn in as the new president because of allegations of fraud and irregularities.

Geography 

The territory controlled by Guyana lies between latitudes 1° and 9°N, and longitudes 56° and 62°W; it is one of the world's most sparsely populated countries.

The country can be divided into five natural regions: a narrow and fertile marshy plain along the Atlantic coast (low coastal plain) where most of the population lives; a white sand belt further inland (hilly sand and clay region), containing most of Guyana's mineral deposits; the dense rain forests (Forested Highland Region) in the southern part of the country; the drier savannah areas in the south-west; and the smallest interior lowlands (interior savannah) consisting mostly of mountains that gradually rise to the Brazilian border.

Some of Guyana's highest mountains are Mount Ayanganna, Monte Caburaí and Mount Roraima ( – the highest mountain in Guyana) on the Brazil-Guyana-Venezuela tripoint border, part of the Pakaraima range. Mount Roraima and Guyana's table-top mountains (tepuis) are said to have been the inspiration for Sir Arthur Conan Doyle's 1912 novel The Lost World. There are also many volcanic escarpments and waterfalls, including Kaieteur Falls which is believed to be the largest single-drop waterfall in the world by volume. North of the Rupununi River lies the Rupununi savannah, south of which lie the Kanuku Mountains.

The Courentyne river forms the border with Suriname.

The climate is tropical and generally hot and humid, though moderated by northeast trade winds along the coast. There are two rainy seasons, the first from May to mid-August, the second from mid-November to mid-January.

Guyana has one of the largest unspoiled rainforests in South America, some parts of which are almost inaccessible by humans. The rich natural history of Guyana was described by early explorers Sir Walter Raleigh and Charles Waterton and later by naturalists Sir David Attenborough and Gerald Durrell. In 2008, the BBC broadcast a three-part programme called Lost Land of the Jaguar which highlighted the huge diversity of wildlife, including undiscovered species and rare species such as the giant otter and harpy eagle.

In 2012, Guyana received a $45 million reward from Norway for its rainforest protection efforts. This stems from a 2009 agreement between the nations for a total of $250 million for protecting and maintaining the natural habitat. Thus far, the country has received $115 million of the total grant.

Biodiversity and conservation 
Guyana is home to more than 900 species of birds; 225 species of mammals; 880 species of reptiles and more than 6,500 different species of plants. Among these wildlife categories the most notably famous are the Arapaima, which is the world's largest scaled freshwater fish; the giant anteater, the largest anteater; the giant otter, the world's largest and rarest river otter; and the cock-of-the-rock (Rupicola rupicola).

The following habitats have been categorised for Guyana: coastal, marine, littoral, estuarine palustrine, mangrove, riverine, lacustrine, swamp, savanna, white sand forest, brown sand forest, montane, cloud forest, moist lowland and dry evergreen scrub forests (NBAP, 1999). About 14 areas of biological interest have been identified as possible hotspots for a National Protected Area System.
More than 80% of Guyana is still covered by forests, which also contain the world's rarest orchids, ranging from dry evergreen and seasonal forests to montane and lowland evergreen rain forests. These forests are home to more than a thousand species of trees. Guyana's tropical climate, unique geology, and relatively undisturbed ecosystems support extensive areas of species-rich rain forests and natural habitats with high levels of endemism. There are about 8000 species of plants in Guyana, half of which are found nowhere else.

Guyana has one of the highest levels of biodiversity in the world. With 1,168 vertebrate species and 814 bird species, it boasts one of the richest mammalian fauna assemblages of any comparably sized area in the world. Guyana is home to six ecoregions: Guayanan Highlands moist forests, Guianan moist forests, Orinoco Delta swamp forests, Tepuis, Guianan savanna, and Guianan mangroves. The Guiana Shield region is little known and extremely rich biologically. Unlike other areas of South America, over 70% of the natural habitat remains pristine. Guyana ranks third in the world with a 2019 Forest Landscape Integrity Index mean score of 9.58/10.

The rich natural history of British Guiana was described by early explorers Sir Walter Raleigh and Charles Waterton and later by naturalists Sir David Attenborough and Gerald Durrell.

Southern Guyana is host to some of the most pristine expanses of evergreen forests in the northern part of South America. Most of the forests found are tall, evergreen hill-land and lower montane forests, with large expanses of flooded forest along major rivers. Thanks to the very low human population density of the area, most of these forests are still intact. The Smithsonian Institution has identified nearly 2,700 species of plants from this region, representing 239 distinct families, and there are certainly additional species still to be recorded. The diversity of plants supports diverse animal life, recently documented by a biological survey organised by Conservation International. The reportedly clean, unpolluted waters of the Essequibo watershed support a remarkable diversity of fish and aquatic invertebrates, and are home to giant otters, capybaras, and several species of caimans.

On land, large mammals, such as jaguars, tapirs, bush dogs, giant anteaters, and saki monkeys are still common. Over 800 species of birds have been reported from the region, and the reptile and amphibian faunas are similarly rich.

The Iwokrama International Centre for Rain Forest Conservation and Development was also created for the protection and sustainable use of the Iwokrama forest area. Since 2009, Guyana and Norway have collaborated to promote green development in Guyana while keeping deforestation at low levels

Economy 

The main economic activities in Guyana are agriculture (rice and Demerara sugar), bauxite and gold mining, timber, shrimp fishing and minerals.

The discovery of major crude oil reserves off the Atlantic coast has since made a large impact on Guyana's GDP since drilling began in 2019. GDP grew sharply (43%) through the COVID-19 pandemic year of 2020, and is anticipated to continue at a high level in 2021 (estimated at 20%). The non-oil sectors contracted as public health measures were in place to control the virus spread; the growth of GDP rests on the oil sector for these two years.

Preservation of Guyana's pristine forests has been a key component for receiving international aid through REDD programs.

Summary 
GDP: US$4.121 billion ($5,252 per capita, 2019 est.)
GDP growth rate: 86.7% (2020)
Inflation: 12.3%
Unemployment: 21.5% (2017)
Arable land: 2%
Labour force: 324,943 (2019)
Agricultural produce: sugar, rice, vegetable oils, beef, pork, poultry, dairy products, fish, shrimp
Industrial production: bauxite, sugar, rice milling, timber, textiles, gold mining
Exports: US$1.439 billion; Canada 24.9%, US 16.5%, Panama 9.6%, UK 7.7%, Jamaica 5.1%, Trinidad and Tobago 5% (2017)
Imports: US$1.626 billion; Trinidad and Tobago 27.5%, US 26.5%, China 8.9%, Suriname 6.1% (2017)

History 
The earliest residents of Guyana, the Amerindians of various tribes, employed a variety of agricultural practices for subsistence living but also had extensive networks of trade, dealing in items such as blow pipes, curare, cassava graters, and other essentials. These trade networks were important even at the time of the earliest European contact, and Dutch traders were inclined to gift the local peoples in order to maintain successful settlements.

After the initial rush to find gold in the New World waned, the Dutch found the climate to be suitable for growing sugar cane, converting large tracts of the Guyanese coast into plantations and supplying with labour from the Atlantic slave trade. The country and economy were run by a small European planter elite which continued on when the colonies of the territory were merged and the land was given over to the British Empire in 1814. Upon emancipation in 1838, almost all of the former slaves abandoned the plantations, and Indians were brought to the country under indenture contracts from 1838 until the end of the system in 1917.

The production of balatá (natural latex) was once a big business in Guyana. Most of the balata bleeding in Guyana took place in the foothills of the Kanuku Mountains in the Rupununi savannah. Early exploitation also took place in the North West District, but most of the trees in the area were destroyed by illicit bleeding methods that involved cutting down the trees rather than making incisions in them. Uses of balatá included the making of cricket balls, temporary dental fillings, and the crafting of figurines and other decorative items (particularly by the Macushi people).

When the country gained independence from British rule, a policy of nationalization was enacted by Forbes Burnham to address the inequities that were established by plantation-based colonial rule. All large scale industries such as foreign-owned bauxite mining (Reynolds Metals and Rio Tinto's Alcan) and sugar (GuySuCo) operations were taken over by the government. However, the economy under nationalization was plagued by problems; political instability leading to an exodus of skilled labour, inexperienced management, aging infrastructure. Poor international market conditions also expanded the country's debt.

The Guyanese economy rebounded slightly and exhibited moderate economic growth after 1999, due to expansion in the agricultural and mining sectors, a more favourable atmosphere for business initiatives, a more realistic exchange rate, fairly low inflation, and the continued support of international organisations. Guyana held huge amounts of debt which have been written off through various international agencies. In 2003 Guyana qualified for US$329 million of debt relief, in addition to the US$256 million from the original World Bank plan for assisting heavily indebted poor countries in 1999. The Multilateral Debt Relief Initiative in 2006/7 wrote off about US$611 million of Guyana's debt by the International Monetary Fund, the World Bank and the Inter-American Development Bank. In 2006, Japan finalised its bilateral debt cancellation agreement, in 2007, US$15 million was written off by China and in 2008, Venezuela cancelled US$12.5 million.

In 2008, the economy witnessed a 3% increase in growth amid the global economic crisis; it grew 5.4% in 2011 and 3.7% in 2012. IMF projected economic growth to be 53% in 2020 following the completion of the first off-shore oil project. Actual growth in GDP in 2020 was 43%; reports in April 2021 anticipate 20% growth for 2021.

Tax policy 
The government initiated a major overhaul of the tax code in early 2007. A Value Added Tax (VAT) replaced six different taxes. Prior to the implementation of the VAT, it had been relatively easy to evade sales tax, and many businesses were in violation of tax code. Many businesses opposed VAT introduction because of the extra paperwork required; however, the Government has remained firm on the VAT. Replacing several taxes with one flat tax rate, it will also be easier for government auditors to spot embezzlement. This was prevalent under the former PPP/C government who authorised the VAT to be equal to 50% of the value of the good.

Organizations 
Major private sector organisations include the Private Sector Commission (PSC) and the Georgetown Chamber of Commerce & Industry (GCCI);

Demographics 

The present population of Guyana is racially and ethnically heterogeneous, with ethnic groups originating from India, Africa, Europe and China, as well as indigenous or aboriginal peoples. Despite their diverse ethnic backgrounds, these groups share two common languages: English and Guyanese English Creole.

The largest ethnic group is the Indo-Guyanese (also known as East Indians), the descendants of indentured labourers from India who make up 43.5% of the population, according to the 2002 census. They are followed by the Afro-Guyanese, the descendants of slaves imported from Africa, who constitute 30.2%. The Guyanese of mixed heritage make up 16.7%, while the indigenous peoples (known locally as Amerindians) make up 9.1%. The indigenous groups include the Arawaks, the Wai Wai, the Caribs, the Akawaio, the Arecuna, the Patamona, the Wapixana, the Macushi, and the Warao. The two largest groups, the Indo-Guyanese and Afro-Guyanese, have experienced some racial tension.

Most Indo-Guyanese are descended from indentured labourers who migrated from North India, especially the Bhojpur and Awadh regions of the Hindi Belt in the present day states of Uttar Pradesh, Bihar, and Jharkhand. A significant minority of Indo-Guyanese are also descended from indentured migrants who came from the South Indian states of Tamil Nadu and Andhra Pradesh; these South Indian descendants are the plurality ancestry in the East Berbice-Corentyne region.

Largest cities

Languages 

English is the official language of Guyana and is used for education, government, media, and services. The vast majority of the population speaks Guyanese Creole, an English-based creole with slight African, Indian, and Amerindian influences, as their native tongue.

Indigenous Cariban languages (Akawaio, Wai-Wai, and Macushi) are spoken by a small minority of Amerindians.

Guyanese Hindustani is spoken by the older generation of the Indo-Guyanese community, but younger Guyanese use English or Guyanese Creole.

Religion

Religious groups

Religious sect groups
 

In 2012 the population was 63% Christian, 25% Hindu, 7% Muslim.

Religion is an important aspect of identity in Guyana and reflects the various external influences of colonialism and immigrant groups. Christianity was considered the prestigious religion, transmitting European culture and representing upward mobility in the colonial society. Missionaries and churches built schools, and until nationalization in the 1970s, nearly all schools were denominational. When Indians were brought to the country as indentured labour, Hinduism and Islam gained prominence, but for some decades neither were acknowledged for legal marriage.

Some traditional African and Amerindian folk beliefs remain alongside the dominant religions.

Government

Politics 

The politics of Guyana takes place in a framework of a Parliamentary representative democratic republic, in which the President of Guyana is both head of state and head of government, and of a multi-party system. Executive power is exercised by the President and the Government. Legislative power is vested in both the President and the National Assembly of Guyana. Historically, politics are a source of tension in the country, and violent riots have often broken out during elections. During the 1970s and 1980s, the political landscape was dominated by the People's National Congress.

In 1992, the first constitutional elections were overseen by former United States President Jimmy Carter, and the People's Progressive Party led the country until 2015. The two parties are principally organised along ethnic lines and as a result often clash on issues related to the allocation of resources. In the General Elections held on 28 November 2011, the People's Progressive Party (PPP) retained a majority, and their presidential candidate Donald Ramotar was elected as president.

On 11 May 2015, early general elections were held. A coalition of the A Partnership for National Unity-Alliance for Change (APNU-AFC) parties won 33 of the 65 seats in the National Assembly. On 16 May 2015, retired army general David A. Granger became the eighth President of Guyana. However, on 21 December 2018, a vote of confidence was called for, regarding terms under which the government granted a franchise for offshore oil exploration. Legislator Charrandass Persaud defected from the coalition and the vote failed, requiring new elections. The governing coalition litigated this result for the entire 90 days allowed for new elections. New elections were held on March 2, 2020, and results were declared on August 3, 2020, with the People's Progressive Party/Civic as the winner. Mohamed Irfaan Ali became the ninth President of Guyana.

Public procurement 
Public procurement in Guyana is overseen by the Public Procurement Commission, appointed under the Public Procurement Commission Act 2003. Due to lengthy delay in identifying and agreeing commission members, the commission was not appointed until 2016.

Military 

The Guyana Defence Force (GDF) is the military service of Guyana.

Human rights 

Homosexual acts, as well as anal and oral sex, are illegal in Guyana. It is currently the only country in South America that prohibits such acts. Engaging in such acts can warrant life imprisonment, though the prohibition is not enforced. These laws can be difficult to alter, as Guyana's Constitution protects laws inherited from the British Empire from constitutional review. However, cross-dressing has been legal since 2018, when a ban was struck down by Guyana's court of last resort, the Caribbean Court of Justice. President David A. Granger (2015–2020) expressed support for these efforts.

Administrative divisions

Regions and Neighbourhood Councils  
Guyana is divided into 10 regions:

The regions are divided into 27 neighbourhood councils.

Natural regions. 
Guyana is divided into four (4) natural regions. These are:

 Low Coastal Plain
 Hilly Sand and Clay 
 Highland Region 
 Interior Savannahs

International and regional relations

Boundary disputes 

Guyana is in border disputes with both Suriname, which claims the area east of the left bank of the Corentyne River and the New River in southwestern Suriname, and Venezuela which claims the land west of the Essequibo River, once the Dutch colony of Essequibo as part of Venezuela's Guayana Essequiba. The maritime component of the territorial dispute with Suriname was arbitrated by the United Nations Convention on Law of the Sea, and a ruling was announced on 21 September 2007. The ruling concerning the Caribbean Sea north of both nations found both parties violated treaty obligations and declined to order any compensation to either party.

When the British surveyed British Guiana in 1840, they included the entire Cuyuni River basin within the colony. Venezuela did not agree with this as it claimed all lands west of the Essequibo River. In 1898, at Venezuela's request, an international arbitration tribunal was convened, and in 1899 the tribunal issued an award giving about 94% of the disputed territory to British Guiana. The arbitration was concluded, settled and accepted into International law by both Venezuela and the UK. Venezuela brought up again the settled claim, during the 1960s cold war period, and during Guyana's Independence period. This issue is now governed by the Treaty of Geneva of 1966, which was signed by the Governments of Guyana, Great Britain and Venezuela, and Venezuela continues to claim Guayana Esequiba. Venezuela calls this region "Zona en Reclamación" (Reclamation Zone) and Venezuelan maps of the national territory routinely include it, drawing it in with dashed lines.

Specific small disputed areas involving Guyana are Ankoko Island with Venezuela; Corentyne River with Suriname; and Tigri Area or New River Triangle with Suriname. In 1967 a Surinamese survey team was found in the New River Triangle and was forcibly removed. In August 1969 a patrol of the Guyana Defence Force found a survey camp and a partially completed airstrip inside the triangle, and documented evidence of the Surinamese intention to occupy the entire disputed area. After an exchange of gunfire, the Surinamese were driven from the triangle.

The Organisation of American States (OAS) 
Guyana entered the Organisation of American States in 1991.

Indigenous Leaders Summits of America (ILSA) 
With Guyana having many groups of indigenous persons and given the geographical location of the country, the contributions of the Guyanese to the OAS respecting indigenous people may be significant.

The position of the OAS respecting indigenous persons developed over the years. "The "OAS has supported and participated in the organisation of Indigenous Leaders Summits of Americas (ILSA)"

The Draft American Declaration of the Rights of the Indigenous Persons appears to be a working document

Agreements which affect financial relationships

The Double Taxation Relief (CARICOM) Treaty 1994 
At a CARICOM Meeting, representatives of Trinidad and Tobago and Guyana respectively signed The Double Taxation Relief (CARICOM) Treaty 1994 on 19 August 1994.

This treaty covered taxes, residence, tax jurisdictions, capital gains, business profits, interest, dividends, royalties and other areas.

FATCA 
On 30 June 2014, Guyana signed a Model 1 agreement with the United States of America in relation to the Foreign Account Tax Compliance Act (FATCA).
This Model 1 agreement includes a reference to the Tax Information Exchange Agreement (Clause 3) which was signed on 22 July 1992 in Georgetown, Guyana intending to exchange Tax information on an automatic basis.

Infrastructure and telecommunications

Transport 

Navigable waterways extend , including the Berbice, Demerara, and Essequibo rivers.
There are ports at Georgetown, Port Kaituma, and New Amsterdam. There are two international airports (Cheddi Jagan International Airport, Timehri and Eugene F. Correira International Airport (formerly Ogle Airport); along with about 90 airstrips, nine of which have paved runways. Guyana, Suriname and the Falkland Islands are the only three regions in South America that drive on the left.

Electricity 

The electricity sector in Guyana is dominated by Guyana Power and Light (GPL), the state-owned vertically integrated utility. Although the country has a large potential for hydroelectric and bagasse-fuelled power generation, most of its 226 MW of installed capacity correspond to diesel-engine driven generators.

Several initiatives are in place to improve energy access in the hinterland.

Health 

Life expectancy at birth is estimated to be 69.5 years as of 2020.

The PAHO/ WHO Global Health Report 2014 (using statistics of 2012) ranked the country as having the highest suicide rate in the world, with a mortality rate of 44.2 per 100,000 inhabitants. According to 2011 estimates from the WHO, HIV prevalence is 1.2% of the teen/adult population (ages 15–49).

Education 
Education in Guyana was primarily introduced and operated by missionizing Christian denominations. The wealthy planter elite often sent their children for education abroad in England, but as schools improved in Guyana, they also modelled after the former British education system. Primary education became compulsory in 1876, although the need for children to assist in agricultural labour kept many children from schooling. In the 1960s, the government took over control of all schools in the country. Fees were removed, new schools were opened in rural areas, and the University of Guyana was established so students no longer were required to go abroad for tertiary education.Guyana's literacy was one of the highest in the Caribbean, by estimated literacy rate of 96 per cent in 1990. In a 2014 UNESCO estimate, literacy is 96.7 in the 15–24 year old age group. However, the functional literacy may be only as high as 70%.

Students are expected to take the NGSA (National Grade Six Assessment) for entrance into high school in grade 7. They take the CXC at the end of high school. Schools have introduced the CAPE exams which all other Caribbean countries have introduced. The A-level system, inherited from the British era, is offered only in a few schools.

Infrastructure challenges impact access to education, especially students in the hinterland. A World Bank assessment showed roughly 50% of teachers were "untrained, operated with inadequate teaching materials, and served children of parents with low levels of adult literacy".

Culture 

Guyana's culture is very similar to that of the English-speaking Caribbean, and has historically been tied to the English-speaking Caribbean as part of the British Empire when it became a possession in the nineteenth century.

Guyanese culture developed as forced and voluntary immigrants adapted and converged with the dominant British culture. Slavery eradicated much of the distinction between differing African cultures, encouraging the adoption of Christianity and the values of British colonists, which laid the foundations of today's Afro-Guyanese culture. Arriving later and under somewhat more favourable circumstances, Indian immigrants were subjected to less assimilation, and preserved more aspects of Indian culture, such as religion, cuisine, music, festivals, and clothing.

Guyana's geographical location, its sparsely populated rain-forest regions, and its substantial Amerindian population differentiate it from English-speaking Caribbean countries. Its blend of the two dominant Indo-Guyanese and Afro-Guyanese cultures gives it similarities to Trinidad and Tobago and Suriname, and distinguishes it from other parts of the Americas. Guyana shares similar interests with the islands in the West Indies, such as food, festive events, music, sports, etc.

Events include Mashramani (Mash), Phagwah (Holi), and Deepavali (Diwali).

Landmarks 

St George's Anglican Cathedral: A historic Anglican Cathedral made of wood.
Demerara Harbour Bridge: The world's fourth-longest floating bridge.
Berbice Bridge: The world's sixth-longest floating bridge.
Caribbean Community (CARICOM) Building: Houses the headquarters of the largest and most powerful economic union in the Caribbean.
Providence Stadium: Situated on Providence on the east bank of the Demerara River and built in time for the ICC World Cup 2007, it is the largest sports stadium in the country. It is also near the Providence Mall, forming a major spot for leisure in Guyana.
Arthur Chung Conference Centre: Presented as a gift from the People's Republic of China to the Government of Guyana. It is the only one of its kind in the country.
Stabroek Market: A large cast-iron colonial structure that looked like a statue was located next to the Demerara River.
Georgetown City Hall: A beautiful wooden structure also from the colonial era.
Takutu River Bridge: A bridge across the Takutu River, connecting Lethem in Guyana to Bonfim in Brazil.
Umana Yana: An Amerindian benab, that is a national monument built in 1972, for a meeting of the Foreign Ministers of the Non-Aligned nations (It was rebuilt in 2016).
Shell Beach: Approximately 140 km long beach. In some parts beach consists of pure shells, very high biological diversity. Important nesting site for 8 species of sea turtles.
Parliament Building of Guyana: Parliament Building currently houses the seat of the National Assembly of the Government of Guyana. Located in Stabroek, facing Brickdam and bordered by Hadfield Street, High Street, and Cornhill Street

Sports 

The major sports in Guyana are cricket (Guyana is part of the West Indies cricket team for international cricket purposes), basketball, football and volleyball. Minor sports include softball cricket (beach cricket), field hockey, netball, rounders, lawn tennis, table tennis, boxing, squash, rugby, horse racing and a few others.

Guyana played host to international cricket matches as part of the 2007 Cricket World Cup (CWC 2007). The new 15,000-seat Providence Stadium, also referred to as Guyana National Stadium, was built in time for the World Cup and was ready for the beginning of play on 28 March. At the first international game of CWC 2007 at the stadium, Lasith Malinga of the Sri Lankan team took four wickets in four consecutive deliveries.

Guyana's national basketball team has traditionally been one of the top contenders at the CaribeBasket, the top international basketball tournament for countries in the Caribbean.

For international football purposes, Guyana is part of CONCACAF. The highest league in their club system is the GFF Elite League. Guyana's national football team has never qualified for the FIFA World Cup; however, they qualified for the Caribbean Cup in 1991, finishing fourth, and 2007. In 2019, they qualified for the CONCACAF Gold Cup for the first time, after finishing seventh in the qualifiers. They finished third in Group D, having lost two matches and drawn one.

Guyana also has five courses for horse racing.

Guyana featured a beach volleyball team at the 2019 South American Beach Games.

See also 

Index of Guyana-related articles
Outline of Guyana
Petroleum industry in Guyana
Tourism in Guyana

Explanatory notes

References

Further reading 

Donald Haack, Bush Pilot in Diamond Country
Hamish MacInnes, Climb to the Lost World (1974)
Andrew Salkey, Georgetown Journal (1970)
Marion Morrison, Guyana (Enchantment of the World Series)
Bob Temple, Guyana
Noel C. Bacchus, Guyana Farewell: A Recollection of Childhood in a Faraway Place
Marcus Colchester, Guyana: Fragile Frontier
Matthew French Young, Guyana: My Fifty Years in the Guyanese Wilds
Margaret Bacon, Journey to Guyana
Father Andrew Morrison SJ, Justice: The Struggle For Democracy in Guyana 1952–1992

D. Graham Burnett, Masters of All They Surveyed: Exploration, Geography and a British El Dorado
Ovid Abrams, Metegee: The History and Culture of Guyana

Gerald Durrell, Three Singles To Adventure
Cheddi Jagan. The West on Trial: My Fight for Guyana's Freedom
Cheddi Jagan. My Fight For Guyana's Freedom: With Reflections on My Father by Nadira Jagan-Brancier.
Colin Henfrey, Through Indian Eyes: A Journey Among the Indian Tribes of Guiana.
Stephen G. Rabe, US Intervention in British Guiana: A Cold War Story.
Charles Waterton, Wanderings in South America.
David Attenborough, Zoo Quest to Guiana (Lutterworth Press, London: 1956).
John Gimlette, Wild Coast: Travels on South America's Untamed Edge, 2011.

External links 

Office of the President, Republic of Guyana (official website).
Parliament of the Cooperative Republic of Guyana (official website).

Guyana. The World Factbook. Central Intelligence Agency.
Country Profile from the BBC News.
Guyana from the Encyclopædia Britannica.
Guyana at UCB Libraries GovPubs.

The State of the World's Midwifery, Guyana Country Profile .
Key Development Forecasts for Guyana from International Futures.

 
The Guianas
Republics in the Commonwealth of Nations
Countries in South America
Small Island Developing States
English-speaking countries and territories
Former British colonies and protectorates in the Americas
Former monarchies of South America
Member states of the Caribbean Community
Member states of the Commonwealth of Nations
Member states of the Organisation of Islamic Cooperation
Member states of the Union of South American Nations
Member states of the United Nations
States and territories established in 1966
1966 establishments in South America